Aditi Avasthi is an Indian entrepreneur who founded and is CEO of Embibe, an educational technology company, based in Bangalore. She was also ranked among BBC's top 100 Women in 2017. In 2018, she was chosen the 'Woman Of The Year’ by Vogue in 2018.

Early life and education 
Avasthi was born in Ludhiana, Punjab, India on 10 December 1981. She is the daughter of Arun Kumar and Veena Avasthi. She had studied in multiple schools in India. In high school, she was intrigued by personalized education platforms.

Avasthi received a bachelor's degree in engineering from Thapar University in 2003, and received her MBA in finance and marketing from the University of Chicago Booth School of Business in 2010.

Career
Following her schooling in India, Aditi started her career at Tata Consultancy Services where she collaborated in the growth of new business initiatives in the UK. While at Tata Consultancy Services, she won AIMI Young Leaders project, although her nomination for the award was initially rejected as she was too young.

After her MBA, she joined Barclays as Deputy Chief of Product and Strategy Head for their mobile banking division in Africa. Later moving to Delaware, USA, in the year 2012, she worked at Barclaycard as the Director of Corporate Development in Mobile Commerce Business for an year. At Barclays, Avasthi contributed to overall mobile business strategy, and also led the design of the business cases on the monetization of mobile commerce.

In 2012, she founded Embibe, with $700,000 funding gathered from family and friends, and she received further investments from Kalaari Capital and Lightbox Ventures during the following year. which is a personalized engine for education based on a knowledge graph that connects all grades' curriculum and learning context together, so students can achieve their targeted learning outcomes. The platform also provides services based on the Joint Entrance Examination – Advanced. Later she conducted a successful corporate round with Reliance Industries in 2018. In April 2018, Reliance Industries Limited announced an investment of $180 million in Embibe.

Avasthi commented on her business, "Running my own business and being able to breathe life into my vision of disrupting the education system using data science and technology makes me more determined to achieve my goals. Patience, persistence and being able to multi-task come naturally to me as well as most women so that is a big advantage when starting from scratch."

Awards 

 [[40 Under 40|Fortune'''s 40 Under 40]], in 2015
 Business Impact Woman Entrepreneur of the Year, Digital Disruptor
 BBC 100 Women for addressing illiteracy in 2017
 40 Under 40 by Business World 2017
 Vogue Woman of the Year, under the category Young achiever, in 2018
 CEO of the Year, Edtechreview, February 2018
 AICRA, January 2019
 Woman Entrepreneur of the Year, Indian Education Congress/ Entrepreneur magazine, February 2019
 CEO of the Year 2019 - India, CEO Monthly, March 2019
 Accenture Vahini Innovator of the Year, Economic Times'' Prime Women Leadership Awards, March 2019

References

Living people
Indian women company founders
Indian company founders
University of Chicago alumni
BBC 100 Women
1981 births